gwendolyn yoppolo (b. 1968, Redwood City, California) is an American artist known for her ceramic work. She creates pieces with form and function. yoppolo attended Haverford College, Penn State University, and Columbia University. In 2017 an exhibit entitled Gwendolyn Yoppolo: Holding Forth was held at the Clay Studio in Philadelphia. Her work, scoopbowl service, was acquired by the Smithsonian American Art Museum as part of the Renwick Gallery's 50th Anniversary Campaign.

References

1968 births
Living people
Artists from California
20th-century American women artists
American women ceramists
20th-century American ceramists
21st-century American ceramists
21st-century American women artists
Haverford College alumni
Pennsylvania State University alumni
Columbia University alumni
People from Redwood City, California